The 6th Your World Awards, is the sixth annual award hosted by Telemundo, which awarded prizes to the beauty, music and telenovela. It was broadcast on August 24, 2017, at 8pm/7c.

Puerto Rican singer, Olga Tañón was honored with the Jenni Rivera Legacy Award in recognition of her career and philanthropic achievements. Panamanian-born singer, Miguel Bosé was awarded the El Poder en Ti (The Power In You) award for his philanthropic achievements. Telemundo honored Puerto Rican journalist, María Celeste Arrarás with the Estrella de Tu Mundo (Star of Your World) award to celebrate 15 years of hosting the news show Al Rojo Vivo.

Winners and nominees

Series

Music

Variety

References 

Telemundo original programming
Premios
Premios Tu Mundo